Karolis Lukošiūnas (born 4 August 1997) is a Lithuanian basketball player for Žalgiris Kaunas of the Lithuanian Basketball League (LKL) and the EuroLeague.

Professional career
Lukošiūnas started his professional career signing with Ežerūnas Molėtai. After impressive 2017-18 season with Ežerūnas, Lukošiūnas was invited to BC Šiauliai.

References

1997 births
Living people
BC Šiauliai players
Lithuanian men's basketball players
Small forwards
Basketball players from Vilnius